The 2002 Oregon Ducks football team represented the University of Oregon during the 2002 NCAA Division I-A football season.

Before the season

Recruiting

Schedule

Game summaries

Mississippi State

    
    
    
    
    
    
    
    
    

Jason Fife's first start for Oregon.

UCLA

Roster

References

Oregon
Oregon Ducks football seasons
Oregon Ducks football